The Grande Prémio Internacional de Rio Maior em Marcha Atlética (Rio Maior International Race Walking Grand Prix) is an annual racewalking competition that takes place in April in Rio Maior in Portugal. It is an elite level event which features a men's and a women's race in the 20 kilometres race walk.

History
The event was first held in October 1991 with a 10 km racewalk for men and 5 km women's race. After hosting the 1992 Portuguese Racewalking Championships, the meeting began in its April schedule in 1993 and switched to a men's 20 km/women's 10 km format. This continued until 1999, at which point the women's race was increased to 20 km and has remained so (with the exception of the 2002 edition).

Since 2004, the competition has been part of the IAAF World Race Walking Challenge circuit – the top level meeting series for international racewalking. It is one of two professional level racewalking competitions in Portugal, alongside the Meeting de Marcha Atlética da Cidade de Olhão.

Several athletes have won the race multiple times: Portugal's Susana Feitor is an eight-time winner while Latvian Aigars Fadejevs is the most successful man with four wins. The race usually attracts walkers from Europe, China and Central America – the three regions that produce the most top level athletes. On the men's side, victors include Olympic champions Valeriy Borchin and Olympic silver medallists Aigars Fadejevs, Paquillo Fernández, and Ilya Markov. Among the women's winners are Olympic gold medallists Elena Lashmanova and Olga Kaniskina, world champions Sari Essayah and Hongyu Liu, and Olympic runners-up Elisabetta Perrone and Kjersti Plätzer.

The course route is on a loop in the town centre near the Praça da República (Republic Square) and alongside Parque 25 de Abril. The course records for the 20 km races are 1:18:55 hours set by Valeriy Borchin in 2011 and 1:27:19 hours set by Ryta Turava in 2005.

Past winners

Key:

References

External links
Official website
European Athletics race profile

Racewalking competitions
World Athletics Race Walking Tour
Sport in Rio Maior
Athletics in Portugal
Recurring sporting events established in 1991
1991 establishments in Portugal